Sohag University is a public university in Egypt. It is located in Sohag, on the eastern bank of the Nile.

History
Sohag University became an independent university in 2006. Before 2006, it was part, and branch, of South Valley University which is located in Qena.

Faculties, Colleges and Institutes
 Faculty of Agriculture
 Faculty of Arts
 Faculty of Commerce
 Faculty of Education
 Faculty of Engineering
 Faculty of Industrial Education
 Faculty of Medicine
 Faculty of Nursing
 Faculty of Science
 Faculty of Vet
 Faculty of Pharmacy
 Faculty of Computer and Information Technology

References

Universities in Egypt
Sohag
Educational institutions established in 2006
2006 establishments in Egypt